Cymatocarpus is a genus of flowering plants belonging to the family Brassicaceae.

Its native range is Caucasus to Central Asia.

Species:

Cymatocarpus grossheimii 
Cymatocarpus heterophyllus 
Cymatocarpus pilosissimus

References

Brassicaceae
Brassicaceae genera